Mystic Midway  is a 1992 horror-themed arcade shooter video game for the CD-i where the player must shoot targets to advance to the next level.

Plot
A sarcastic, ghostly theme park owner named Dr. Dearth (Randy Polk) explains all the info about the game, and mysteriously vanishes.

Gameplay
The objective of the game is to accumulate the needed number of points to advance to the next level. Points are scored by shooting down targets. Tombstones appear to block the player's attacks. After either beating or losing a level, Dr. Dearth will either comment or criticize your progress.

Sequel
This game was followed by a 1993 sequel, Mystic Midway: Phantom Express.

References

External links

1992 video games
CD-i games
Light gun games
Video games developed in the United States